Khoa Tran (January 21, 1997) is a Vietnamese-American professional basketball player for the Saigon Heat of the VBA and the Saigon Heat of the Asean Basketball League. He is also known as "Mr. Wiggle" in Vietnam.

Pro career

Saigon Heat (2016–present)
With the formation for the Vietnam Basketball Association, Khoa joined the Saigon Heat side for the league's inaugural season. At the conclusion of the season, he averaged 11.1 points, 3.6 rebounds, and 4.9 assists per game.

Danang Dragons (2017)

Career statistics

VBA 

|-
| style="text-align:left;"| 2016
| style="text-align:left;"| Saigon
| 14 || 11 || 29 || .450 || .330 || .570 || 3.6 || 4.9 || 1.2 || .1 || 11.1
|- class"sortbottom"
| style="text-align:left;"| 2017
| style="text-align:left;"| Danang Dragons
| 9 || 7 || 27 || .420 || .110 || .800 || 6.7 || 2.6 || 2.1 || .0 || 14.9
|- class"sortbottom"
| style="text-align:left;"| 2018
| style="text-align:left;"| Saigon
| 16|| 15|| 33 || .400 || .350 || .680 || 7.5 || 4.6 || 3.3 || .1 || 16.7
|- class"sortbottom"
| style="text-align:center;" colspan="2"| Career
| 39 || 33 || 30 || .420 || .260 || .680 || 5.9 || 4 || 2.2 || .1 || 14.2

Awards and honors

VBA
Rising Star: 2016

References

External links
 Career statistics and player information from vba.vn

1997 births
Living people
Vietnamese emigrants to the United States
American men's basketball players
American sportspeople of Vietnamese descent
Basketball players from Colorado
Competitors at the 2019 Southeast Asian Games
Montana State Billings Yellowjackets men's basketball players
Northern Colorado Bears men's basketball players
People from Highlands Ranch, Colorado
Saigon Heat players
Shooting guards
Sportspeople of Vietnamese descent
Southeast Asian Games bronze medalists for Vietnam
Southeast Asian Games medalists in basketball
Vietnamese basketball players
Southeast Asian Games medalists in 3x3 basketball